The Narcotics Control Bureau ( NCB) is an Indian central law enforcement and intelligence agency under the Ministry of Home Affairs, Government of India. The agency is tasked with combating drug trafficking and the use of illegal substances under the provisions of  Narcotic Drugs and Psychotropic Substances Act. 

Established in 1986, it is responsible for coordination with the Indian state governments and other central departments, implementation of India's international obligations with regard to drug trafficking, and assisting international and foreign drug law enforcement agencies.

Formation
The Narcotics Control Bureau was created on 17 March 1986 to enable the full implementation of The Narcotic Drugs and Psychotropic Substances Act, 1985 and fight its violation through the Prevention of Illicit Trafficking in Narcotic Drugs and Psychotropic Substances Act, 1988. The law was established to fulfill India's treaty obligations under the Single Convention on Narcotic Drugs, Convention on Psychotropic Substances, and United Nations Convention Against Illicit Traffic in Narcotic Drugs and Psychotropic Substances. Officers in this organisation are drawn from Indian Revenue Service, Indian Police Service and Paramilitary forces in addition to directly recruited members.

Organisation
The Narcotics Control Bureau's national headquarters is located in Delhi, the national capital. Its field units and offices are organised by zones and are located in Mumbai, Indore, Kolkata, Delhi, Chennai, Lucknow, Jodhpur, Chandigarh, Jammu, Ahmedabad, Bengaluru, Guwahati and Patna.

The Director General of NCB is mostly an officer from the Indian Police Service (IPS) or the Indian Revenue Service (IRS). Apart from the direct feeder grade, officers in this organisation are also drawn from Indian Revenue Service, Indian Police Service and other Paramilitary forces.

The Narcotics Control Bureau is also represented on the Economic Intelligence Council. NCB is affiliated to Home Ministry, which was made responsible for administering The Narcotic Drugs and Psychotropic Substances Act, 1985. The NCB is outside the ambit of the Right to information Act under Section 24(1) of the RTI act 2005.

Functions
The chief purpose of the Narcotics Control Bureau is to fight drug trafficking on an all-India level. It works in close cooperation with the Customs and Central Excise/GST, State Police Department, Central Bureau of Investigation (CBI), Central Economic Intelligence Bureau (CEIB) and other Indian intelligence and law enforcement agencies both at the national and states level. The NCB also provides resources and training to the personnel of India's Drug Law Enforcement Agencies in fighting drug trafficking. The NCB also monitors India's frontiers to track down points where smuggling activities take place with foreign traffickers.

See also
 Central Bureau of Investigation, anti organised crime which are international, multi-state or multi-agency 
 Directorate of Revenue Intelligence, anti-smuggling 
 Enforcement Directorate, anti economic crimes
 Financial Intelligence Unit, anti money laundering
 National Investigation Agency, anti terrorism
 NIA Most Wanted
 List of Indian intelligence agencies

References

Executive branch of the government of India
Indian intelligence agencies
Government agencies established in 1986
Federal law enforcement agencies of India
Illegal drug trade in Asia
Drug policy of India
1986 establishments in Delhi
Drug control law enforcement agencies
Narcotics Control Bureau
Domestic intelligence agencies